Dilip Bose (1921 – 30 December 1996) was an Indian professional tennis player. He was a winner of the Asian championship and a member of the India Davis Cup team. After retirement, he served as a coach and administrator. The All India Tennis Association instituted a lifetime achievement award in his name in 2002.

Bose won the single's event in the inaugural Asian championships in 1949 at his club, the Calcutta South Club in Calcutta. As a result, he was seeded 15 at the Wimbledon in 1950. He conceded the second round match, upon retiring, to Hans van Swol of the Netherlands with the score 6–4, 5–4 in the latter's favour. He had only recovered from a heavy attack of malaria a few days prior and was advised by doctors against playing. In the same year, he won the double's event at the Berlin championships with Australia's Bill Sidwell.

Career 
Bose won the single's event in the inaugural edition of the First International Lawn Tennis Championships of Asia held in 1949 in Calcutta. India number one ranked player at the time, he defeated compatriot and India's number two ranked Sumant Misra 6–1, 6–2, 8–6 in the final on 1 January 1950.

References

External links 
 
 
 

1921 births
1996 deaths
Bengali Hindus
People from Bihar
Sportspeople from Patna
Indian male tennis players